Xianxi may refer to the following places:

China

 Xianxi, Anhua, a town in Anhua County, Yiyang, Hunan
 Xianxi, Tongdao (县溪镇),  a town of Tongdao Dong Autonomous County, Hunan.
 Xianxi, Yueqing, a town in Yueqing, Wenzhou, Zhejiang

Taiwan

 Xianxi, Changhua, township in Changhua County